Paradoxoglanis caudivittatus is a species of electric catfish endemic to the Democratic Republic of the Congo where it is found in the Tshuapa and Lukenie River systems. This species grows to a length of  SL.

References

Malapteruridae
Catfish of Africa
Endemic fauna of the Democratic Republic of the Congo
Taxa named by Steven Mark Norris
Fish described in 2002
Strongly electric fish